St. George Island (or Saint George Island) may refer to:

St. George Island (Alaska)
St. George Island (Florida)
St. George Island, Maryland
St. George's Island, Bermuda
St. George Island (Montenegro)
Looe Island (also known as St George's Island)
São Jorge Island

See also
St George's Island (disambiguation)
George Island (disambiguation)
Isle St. George AVA, Ohio wine region